Xihe County is a county under the administration of the prefecture-level city of Longnan, in the southeast of Gansu Province of China. The postal code is 742500. The county seat is located in the town of Hanyuan.

Administrative divisions
Xihe County is divided to 16 towns and 4 townships.
Towns

Townships

Climate

References

External links
Xihe County Official Website 

 
County-level divisions of Gansu
Longnan